Montezuma Rimrock Fire District (MRFD) is a fire district that serves the citizens of Beaver Creek, Lake Montezuma and Rimrock, Arizona. MRFD also provides service to Interstate 17 from milepost 306 to milepost 293.

MRFD runs out of fire station 71. It is staffed 24/7 with a minimum ALS crew of 4 personnel, using Engine 711 (Type 1), and Ambulance 711.

MRFD is staffed with 12 line personnel, 1 fire chiefs, and 2 admin personnel.

MRFD ran 960 calls in 2011.

Yavapai County, Arizona